Polutovo is a rural locality (a village) in Krasavinskoye Rural Settlement, Velikoustyugsky District, Vologda Oblast, Russia. The population was 260 as of 2002. There are 10 streets.

Geography 
Polutovo is located 18 km northeast of Veliky Ustyug (the district's administrative centre) by road. Bushkovo is the nearest rural locality.

References 

Rural localities in Velikoustyugsky District